Abdel Sattar Sabry Abdel Majid Mahmoud (born 19 June 1974), known as Sabry, is an Egyptian former professional footballer who played as an attacking midfielder.

Club career
A skilled offensive player, Sabry was born in Cairo, and started playing with Al-Mokawloon al-Arab, moving abroad in 1997 to represent Austria's FC Tirol Innsbruck. He started 1999–2000 in the Superleague Greece with PAOK FC, but switched in January 2000 to S.L. Benfica. In that season, he scored free kick against Sporting CP.

Sabry would play in Portugal until May 2004, representing C.S. Marítimo (January 2002-June 2003) and C.F. Estrela da Amadora. He subsequently returned to his homeland, playing with ENPPI Club for a few months and joining El Geish shortly after, in the Egyptian Premier League.

Sabry ended his playing career in July 2010, at the age of 36. Subsequently, he joined El Geish's coaching staff.

International career
A prominent feature in the Egypt national team in the mid-late 1990s, Sabry made his debut against Angola in 1995. He was part of the gold medal-winning side in the 1995 All-Africa Games, and featured in the 1998 Africa Cup of Nations squad which finished champion in Burkina Faso, winning 70 full caps in only six years of international play and scoring 11 goals.

International goals
Scores and results list Egypt's goal tally first, score column indicates score after each Sabry goal.

References

External links

1974 births
Living people
Footballers from Cairo
Egyptian footballers
Association football midfielders
Egypt international footballers
1996 African Cup of Nations players
1998 African Cup of Nations players
1999 FIFA Confederations Cup players
2000 African Cup of Nations players
Al Mokawloon Al Arab SC players
Austrian Football Bundesliga players
FC Tirol Innsbruck players
Super League Greece players
PAOK FC players
Primeira Liga players
S.L. Benfica footballers
C.S. Marítimo players
C.F. Estrela da Amadora players
Egyptian expatriate footballers
Egyptian expatriate sportspeople in Austria
Expatriate footballers in Austria
Egyptian expatriate sportspeople in Greece
Expatriate footballers in Greece
Egyptian expatriate sportspeople in Portugal
Expatriate footballers in Portugal